The Catholic Bishops' Conference of Central Asia is the episcopal conference of Kazakhstan, Kyrgyzstan and Uzbekistan, and also covering the Catholic structures of Tajikistan and Turkmenistan.

History 
In Kazakhstan from 2003 existed the Bishops' Conference of Kazakhstan, while in other Central Asian states existed only pre-diocesan jurisdictions.

On 8 September 2021 was established the new governing body – the Bishops' Conference of Central Asia by the Congregation for the Evangelization of Peoples, and Bishops' Conference of Kazakhstan become as a part of this new creation. The new Conference began to operate in April 2022.

Structure of the Conference 
The governing body was elected on 29 April 2022

President of the Conference:  Bishop José Luís Mumbiela Sierra

Vice-president of the Conference: Bishop Jerzy Maculewicz, O.F.M.Conv.

General Secretary: Bishop Yevgeniy Zinkovskiy

See also 

 Christianity in Kazakhstan
 Catholic Church in Kazakhstan
 Catholic Church in Kyrgyzstan
 Catholic Church in Tajikistan
 Catholic Church in Turkmenistan
 Catholic Church in Uzbekistan

References

External links 
 Profile at GCatholic.org

Central Asia
Catholic Church in Kazakhstan
Catholic Church in Kyrgyzstan
Catholic Church in Tajikistan
Catholic Church in Turkmenistan
Catholic Church in Uzbekistan